The Vienna Conference was the first international conference on ozone layer depletion. It was held in Vienna, Austria in 1985 when a hole in the stratospheric ozone layer was observed in the South Pole marked by increased UV-B infiltration over Antarctica. A 'hole', marked by significant drop in ozone molecules in the layer, as large as that of United States was discovered by a British team.  The Vienna Convention for the Protection of the Ozone Layer was agreed at the conference and it entered into force in 1987.

References
 Beeta Environmental Education book (for ICSE Examinations) -Beeta Publication (A Morning Star Venture)

Climate change conferences
Diplomatic conferences in Austria
Ozone depletion
20th-century diplomatic conferences
1985 conferences
1985 in international relations
1985 in the environment
1985 in Austria
1980s in Vienna